Franci may refer to:
 the Franks, a West Germanic people first attested in the 3rd century
 Franci Kek (born 1964), a Slovenian politician
 Franci Litsingi, an alternative spelling for Francis Litsingi
 Franci Petek (born 1971), a Slovenian geographer and former ski jumper
 Adolfo Franci (born 1895), an Italian screenwriter
 Franci (footballer) (born 1990), Valmir Aparecido Franci de Campos Júnior, Brazilian footballer
 Species Latin name
 Elaphoidella franci, a species of crustacean endemic to Slovenia